Qanavat (also Romanized as Qanavāt) is a city in the Central District of Qom County, Qom Province, Iran. At the 2006 census, its population was 7,693, in 1,887 families.  It lies off Road 7, roughly 10 kilometres southeast of Qom.

References 

Qom County

Cities in Qom Province